Open House! is an album by jazz organist Johnny "Hammond" Smith which was recorded in 1963 and released on the Riverside label.

Reception

The Allmusic site awarded the album 3 stars calling it "accessible, gritty, emotionally direct jazz that you didn't have to be an intellectual to comprehend".

Track listing
All compositions by Johnny "Hammond" Smith except as indicated
 "Open House" - 4:38  
 "Cyra" - 5:27  
 "I Remember You" (Johnny Mercer, Victor Schertzinger) - 5:01  
 "Theme from Cleopatra" (Alex North) - 2:36  
 "Blues for De-De" - 7:00  
 "Why Was I Born?" (Oscar Hammerstein II, Jerome Kern) - 4:41  
 "I Love You" (Cole Porter) - 5:50

Personnel
Johnny "Hammond" Smith - organ
Thad Jones - cornet, trumpet
Seldon Powell — tenor saxophone, flute
Eddie McFadden - guitar
Leo Stevens (tracks 1-4, 6 & 7), Art Taylor (track 5) - drums
Ray Barretto - congas (tracks 1-4, 6 & 7)

References

1963 albums
Johnny "Hammond" Smith albums
Riverside Records albums
Albums produced by Orrin Keepnews